A wet wipe, also known as a wet towel or a moist towelette, disposable wipe, disinfecting wipe, or a baby wipe (in specific circumstances) is a small to medium-sized moistened piece of plastic or cloth that either comes folded and individually wrapped for convenience or, in the case of dispensers, as a large roll with individual wipes that can be torn off. Wet wipes are used for cleaning purposes like personal hygiene and household cleaning; each is a separate product depending on the chemicals added and medical or office cleaning wipes are not intended for skin hygiene.

In 2013, owing to increasing sales of the product in affluent countries, Consumer Reports reported that efforts to make the wipes "flushable" down the toilet had not entirely succeeded, according to their test.

Invention
American Arthur Julius is seen as the inventor of wet wipes. Julius worked in the cosmetics industry and in 1957, adjusted a soap portioning machine, putting it in a loft in Manhattan. Julius trademarked the name Wet-Nap in 1958, a name for the product that is still being used. After fine tuning his new hand-cleaning aid together with a mechanic, he unveiled his invention at the 1960 National Restaurant Show in Chicago and in 1963 started selling Wet-Nap products to Colonel Harland Sanders to be distributed to customers of Kentucky Fried Chicken.

Production

Ninety percent of wet wipes on the market are produced from nonwoven fabrics made of polyester or polypropylene.

The material is moistened with water or other liquids (e.g., isopropyl alcohol) depending on the applications. The material may be treated with softeners, lotions, or perfume to adjust the tactile and olfactory properties. Preservatives such as methylisothiazolinone are used to prevent bacterial or fungal growth in the package. The finished wet wipes are folded and put in pocket size package or a box dispenser.

Uses
Wet wipes can serve a number of personal and household purposes.  Although marketed primarily for wiping infants' bottoms in diaper changing, it is not uncommon for consumers to also use the product to clean floors, toilet seats, and other surfaces around the home. Parents also use wet wipes, or as they are called for baby care, baby wipes, for wiping up baby vomit and to clean babies' hands and faces.

Baby wipes
Baby wipes are wet wipes used to cleanse the sensitive skin of infants. These are saturated with solutions anywhere from gentle cleansing ingredients to alcohol-based "cleaners". Baby wipes are typically different pack counts (ranging up to 80 or more sheets per pack), and come with dispensing mechanisms. The origin of baby wipes most likely came in the mid-1950s as more people were travelling and needed a way to clean up on the go. One of the first companies to produce these was a company called Nice-Pak. They made napkin sized paper cloth saturated with a scented skin cleanser. Rockline Industries of Sheboygan, Wisconsin (which has a large part of the private label wipe market in several segments) went on to be the first to innovate the first baby wipe refill pack and pop-up packs which have become common in the marketplace.

The first wet-wipe products specifically marketed as baby wipes, such as Kimberly-Clark's Huggies wipes and Procter & Gamble's Pampers wipes, appeared on the market in 1990. As the technology to produce wipes matured and became more affordable, smaller brands began to appear. By the 1990s, most super stores like Kmart and Wal-Mart had their own private label brand of wipes made by other manufacturers. After this period there was a boom in the industry and many local brands started manufacturing because of low entry barriers.

Some green-minded parents, or those looking to save extra money, use washable baby wipes, typically small squares of material (such as cotton, bamboo or fleece) that can be pre-soaked ready to use, or wet as required. The cloths are wetted with either just water, commercial wipe solution or homemade solutions. Some parents prefer to use only water or their own homemade solutions as they can more directly control the ingredients used on the child’s skin. Some parents feel that cloth wipes are more effective at removing solids from the skin than commercial one-use wipes because of their textured nature.

In December 2018, a New Zealand company launched the country’s first ever wet and baby wipe alternative, the BDÉT Foam Wash.

Toilet wet wipes
Toilet wet wipes are sometimes preferred to standard toilet tissue.  Many brands sell toilet wet wipes, claiming they are "flushable."  However, in 2013 a Consumer Reports article said that none of the leading brands could pass their test.

Personal hygiene
Wet wipes are often included as part of a standard sealed cutlery package offered in restaurants or along with airline meals.

Wet wipes began to be marketed as a luxury alternative to toilet paper by 2005 by companies such as Kimberly-Clark and Procter & Gamble. They are dispensed in the toilets of restaurants, service stations, doctors' offices, and other places with public use.

Wet wipes have also found a use among visitors to outdoor music festivals, particularly those who camp, as an alternative to communal showers. The wet wipes are a preferable option to the communal facilities, for which there are long queues.

In Southeast Asia, wet wipes are often sold out of refrigerators to give the wipes a refreshingly cool effect.

Cleansing pads
Cleansing pads are fiber sponges which have been previously soaked with water, alcohol and other active ingredients for a specific intended use. They are ready to use hygiene products and they are simple and convenient solutions to dispose of dirt or other undesirable elements.

There are different type of cleansing pads offered by the beauty industry: make-up removing pads, anti-spot treatments and anti-acne pads that usually contain salicylic acid, vitamins, menthol and other treatments).

Cleansing pads for preventing infection are usually saturated with alcohol and bundled in sterile packages. Hands and instruments may be disinfected with these pads while treating wounds. Disinfecting cleansing pads are often included in first aid kits for this purpose. Since the outbreak of H1N1 sales of individual impregnated wet wipes and gels in sachets and flowpacks have dramatically increased in the UK following the Government's advice to keep hands and surfaces clean to prevent the spread of germs.

Industrial wipes
Pre-impregnated industrial-strength cleaning wipes with powerful cleaning fluid that cuts through the dirt as the high performance fabric absorbs the residue. Industrial wipes has the ability to clean a vast range of though substances from hands, tools and surfaces, including: grime, grease, oil- and water-based paints and coatings, adhesives, silicone and acrylic sealants, poly foam, epoxy, oil, tar and more.

Pain relief
There are pain relief pads sopping with alcohol and benzocaine. These pads are good for treating minor scrapes, burns, and insect bites. They disinfect the injury and also ease pain and itching.

Pet care
Today one can find wet wipes for pet care, for example eye, ear, or dental cleansing pads (with boric acid, potassium chloride, zinc sulfate, sodium borate) for dogs, cats, horses, and birds.

Healthcare
Medical wet wipes are available for various applications. These include alcohol wet wipes, chlorhexidine wipes (for disinfection of surfaces and noninvasive medical devices) and sporicidal wipes. Medical wipes can be used to prevent the spread of pathogens such as norovirus and Clostridium difficile.

Effect on sewage systems
Water management companies ask people not to flush wet wipes down toilets, as their failure to break apart or dissolve in water can cause sewer blockages known as fatbergs.

Since the mid-2000s, wet wipes such as baby wipes have become more common for use as an alternative to toilet paper in affluent countries, including the United States and the United Kingdom. This usage has in some cases been encouraged by manufacturers, who have labelled some wet wipe brands as "flushable". Wet wipes, when flushed down the toilet, have been reported to clog internal plumbing, septic systems and public sewer systems. The tendency for fat and wet wipes to cling together allegedly encourages the growth of the problematic obstructions in sewers known as "fatbergs". In addition, some brands of wipes contain alcohol, which can kill the bacteria and enzymes responsible for breaking down solid waste in septic tanks. In the late 2010s, other alternatives such as gel wipe had also come on to the market.

In 2014, a class action suit was filed in the U.S. District Court for the Northern District of Ohio against Target Corporation, and Nice-Pak Products Inc. on behalf of consumers in Ohio who purchased Target-brand flushable wipes. The lawsuit alleged the retailer misled consumers by marking the packaging on its Up & Up brand wipes as flushable and safe for sewer and septic systems. The lawsuit also alleged that the products were a public health hazard because they clogged pumps at municipal waste-treatment facilities. Target and Nice-Pak agreed to settle the case in 2018.

In 2015, the city of Wyoming, Minnesota, launched a class action suit against six companies, including Procter & Gamble, Kimberly-Clark, and Nice-Pak, alleging they were fraudulently promoting their products as "flushable". The city dropped the lawsuit in 2018 after concluding that the city had not experienced damage to its sewer systems or a rise in maintenance costs. Upon announcement of the withdrawal of the suit, an industry trade group representing the manufacturers of the wipes released a statement that disputed the claims that the products are harmful to sewer systems.

In 2019, the industry body Water UK announced a new standard for flushable wet wipes. Wipes will need to pass rigorous testing in order to gain a new and approved "Fine to Flush" logo. As of January 2019, only one product had been confirmed to meet the standard, although there were about seven others in the process of being tested.

See also
 
 
 Oshibori, reusable Japanese wet hand towel
 Washlet, a mechanical alternative to wet wipes

References

Personal hygiene products
Disinfectants
Paper products
Toilets
Babycare
Disposable products